This list of churches in Sør-Hålogaland is a list of the Church of Norway churches in the Diocese of Sør-Hålogaland which includes all of Nordland county in Norway. The diocese is based at the Bodø Cathedral in the town of Bodø.

The list is divided into several sections, one for each deanery in the diocese. Each  is led by a provost. Administratively within each deanery, the churches are divided by municipalities which have their own church council. Each municipal church council may be made up of one or more parishes, each of which may have their own council. Each parish may have one or more congregations in it.

Bodø domprosti 
This arch-deanery is home to the Bodø Cathedral, the seat of the Bishop of the Diocese of Sør-Hålogaland. Bodø domprosti covers the five municipalities of Bodø, Gildeskål, Meløy, Røst, and Værøy. The deanery is headquartered at Bodø Cathedral in the town of Bodø.  The deanery was created in 1901 when it was split off from the old Søndre Salten prosti.  The deanery was upgraded to an arch-deanery in 1952 when the Diocese of Sør-Hålogaland was created.

Lofoten prosti 
This deanery covers four municipalities in the Lofoten island district of Nordland county.  The deanery is headquartered in the town of Svolvær in Vågan Municipality.  The deanery was created when the old Lofoten og Vesterålen prosti was divided in two, creating Lofoten prosti in the south and Vesterålen prosti in the north.

Vesterålen prosti 
This deanery covers six municipalities in the Vesterålen island district of Nordland county.  The deanery is headquartered in the town of Stokmarknes in Hadsel Municipality.  The deanery was created when the old Lofoten og Vesterålen prosti was divided in two, creating Lofoten prosti in the south and Vesterålen prosti in the north. On 1 January 2020, the churches in Lødingen Municipality were transferred from the Ofoten prosti to the Vesterålen prosti.

Ofoten prosti 
This deanery covers three municipalities in the Ofoten district in the northern part of Nordland county: Narvik, Evenes, and Hamarøy.  The deanery is headquartered in the town of Narvik in Narvik Municipality.  This deanery is the successor to the old Nordre Salten prosti that was originally created in 1850 when it was split off from the Salten prosti. On 1 January 2020, the churches in Lødingen Municipality were transferred from here to the Vesterålen prosti.

Salten prosti 
This deanery covers five municipalities in the Salten district of Nordland county.  The deanery is headquartered in the town of Fauske in Fauske Municipality.  The deanery was created in 1649 and existed as such until 1849.  In 1850, the deanery was divided into two:  Søndre Salten prosti in the south (Gildeskål, Skjerstad, Saltdal, Bodø, and Folda prestegjelds) and Nordre Salten prosti in the north (Steigen, Hamarøy, Lødingen, and Ofoten prestegjelds).  In 1901, Søndre Salten prosti was split into Bodø prosti (Bodø, Bodin, Kjerringøy, and  Folda) and Søndre Salten prosti ( Gildeskål, Beiarn, Skjerstad, and Saltdal).

Nord-Helgeland prosti 
This deanery covers eight municipalities in the northwestern part of the Helgeland district of Nordland county.  The deanery is headquartered in the town of Sandnessjøen in Alstahaug Municipality.

Indre Helgeland prosti 
This deanery covers five municipalities in the eastern part of the Helgeland district of Nordland county.  The deanery is headquartered in the town of Mo i Rana in Rana Municipality.

Sør-Helgeland prosti 
This deanery covers five municipalities in the southwestern part of the Helgeland district of Nordland county.  The deanery is headquartered in the town of Brønnøysund in Brønnøy Municipality.

References

 
Sor Haalogaland